The mass trespass of Kinder Scout was a trespass by  members of the Young Communist League, the youth branch of the Communist Party of Great Britain (CPGB), at Kinder Scout in the Peak District, Derbyshire, England, on 24 April 1932, to highlight that walkers were denied access to areas of open country. It was organised by Benny Rothman, secretary of the British Workers' Sports Federation.

Events in 1932
The 1932 trespass was a coordinated protest involving three groups of walkers who approached Kinder Scout from different directions at the same time. Accounts of the numbers involved vary widely: a Times article at the time reported that it was about 100, Benny Rothman claimed it was between 600 and 800, and poet and folk singer Ewan MacColl, who participated in the walk and wrote a song sung by the walkers, remembered it as over 3,000. The generally accepted figure is that reported by the Manchester Guardian at the time, of an estimated 400 people. The trespassers began at Bowden Bridge quarry near Hayfield. They proceeded via William Clough to the plateau of Kinder Scout, where there were violent scuffles with gamekeepers. The ramblers were able to reach their destination and meet with another group at Ashop Head. On the return, five ramblers were arrested, with another detained earlier. Trespass was not and is not a criminal offence in England, but some received jail sentences of two to six months for offences relating to violence involving the keepers.

Political effects 

According to the Hayfield Kinder Trespass Group website, this act of civil disobedience was one of the most successful in British history. It arguably led to the passage of the National Parks legislation in 1949 and helped pave way for the establishment of the Pennine Way and other long-distance footpaths. Walkers' rights to travel through common land and uncultivated upland were eventually protected by the Countryside and Rights of Way Act (CROW Act) of 2000. Though controversial when it occurred, it has been interpreted as the embodiment of "working class struggle for the right to roam versus the rights of the wealthy to have exclusive use of moorlands for grouse shooting."

The Kinder Mass Trespass was one of a number of protests at the time seeking greater access to the moorlands of the northern Peak District. What set it apart from the others was it marked a new and more radical approach to the problem which was not universally popular with rambling groups. The harshness of the sentences imposed on the leaders of the protest was headline news in local and national newspapers, resulting in the issue gaining public attention and sympathy. The subsequent access rally staged in Winnats Pass attracted 10,000 people to attend in support of greater access to the adjacent moorland.

An unintended consequence of the mass trespass was greater interest being paid to ramblers' behaviour and potential ways to regulate it. This resulted in a 'Code of Courtesy for the Countryside' being produced, which was a forerunner of the modern Countryside Code.

Revisionism on the Kinder Scout trespass 
A number of writers have criticised the narrative of the success of the Kinder Scout trespass. In 2011, historian David Hey questioned the narrative of the Kinder Scout trespass as "a simple explanation of the triumph of the 'right to roam' movement". According to Hey, the trespass on balance did "more harm than good". In 2002, Philip Day of the Manchester Ramblers' Federation stated the trespass was commonly used by opponents of the access movement as an argument for denying access even into the 1950s and 1960s, bringing a "positive hindrance" to the efforts of the movement. In 1989, walkers' rights activist Tom Stephenson challenged the assertion that the trespassers had reached the summit of Kinder Scout, saying they made it only as far as Ashop Head. In 2013, historian John K. Walton questioned the absolutism of this revisionism. He advocated for a post-revisionist stance on the mass trespass, acknowledging its positive effects both in the short and long term. He pointed to its symbolic role in the access campaign over the rest of the century that led to the CROW act.

Commemoration 

Ewan MacColl (then known by his real name, Jimmie Miller) anticipated these events in his 1932 song "The Manchester Rambler". The events form the subject of the song "You Can (Mass Trespass, 1932)" on Chumbawamba's 2005 album A Singsong and a Scrap and inspiration for "Walking in the Footsteps of Giants" by northern folk band Harp and a Monkey.

Each year a combination of wardens and rangers from both The National Trust and the Peak District National Park Authority hold a walking event to mark the anniversary of the trespass. A commemorative plaque marks the start of the trespass at Bowden Bridge quarry near Hayfield, now a popular area for ramblers. It was unveiled in April 1982 by Benny Rothman (then aged 70) during a rally to mark the 50th anniversary.

The Young Communist League hikes up Kinder Scout every year on their annual Communist Summer Camp to commemorate their own involvement in the trespass.

See also 
 Fell running
 Freedom to roam
 G. H. B. Ward
 Open Country

Notes

References

Citations

Sources 

 Rothman, Benny. (1982) 1932 Kinder Trespass: Personal View of the Kinder Scout Mass Trespass. Willow Publishing. .

External links 
 Newspaper report of the mass trespass
 Right To Roam Act of Parliament (explained by BBC News)
 Article on Benny Rothman from WCML website
 Details of Benny Rothman archives at WCML

1932 in England
Conflicts in 1932
Kinder Scout Trespass
Kinder Scout Trespass
Peak District
Kinder Scout Trespass
Walking in the United Kingdom
Freedom to roam
1930s in Derbyshire
April 1932 events
1932 protests